Bhola Yadav (born 18 September 1962) is an Indian politician from Bihar. He was a member of 16th Vidhan Sabha of Bihar. He represented the Bahadurpur (Vidhan Sabha constituency) of Bihar and is a member of the Rashtriya Janata Dal (RJD) political party. He won the 2015 Bihar Legislative Assembly election from Bahadurpur (Vidhan Sabha constituency). He is also currently the National General Secretary of RJD. He is one of the closest aides of Indian politician Lalu Prasad Yadav. He is like a shadow to the ex-CM couple. He is one of the prominent politicians from the RJD family of Bihar political scenario.

Biography

Bhola Yadav was born in Kapchhahi village of Darbhanga district in Bihar. His father's name is Shri Ram Prakash Yadav and his mother's name is late Smt. Lakhpati Devi . He is a post-graduate in mathematics from Magadh University and was a guest teacher in a college in Fatuha, near Patna. He married Asha Yadav. They are parents to two daughters and one son.

Political tenure

2014–2015 - Member, Bihar Legislative Council
2015–2020 - Member, Bihar Legislative Assembly (Bahadurpur Constituency)

References 
https://economictimes.indiatimes.com/news/politics-and-nation/Meet-Lalu-Prasad-Yadavs-maithili-speaking-negotiator-Bhola-Yadav/articleshow/49145489.cms
http://vidhansabha.bih.nic.in/index.html
http://vidhansabha.bih.nic.in/pdf/member_profile/85.pdf
https://aajtak.intoday.in/story/bhola-yadav-profile-1-837590.html
https://www.jagran.com/bihar/patna-city-bhola-yadav-known-as-shadows-of-lalu-people-say-hanuman-of-rjd-supremo-17742776.html
https://m.dailyhunt.in/news/india/hindi/live+bihar-epaper-livbihar/lalu+ke+hanuman+bhola+yadav+pahale+the+niji+sahayak+jadayu+ki+madad+se+bane+the+mlc+aur+mla-newsid-79438246

External links
 Home Page of Bihar Legislative Assembly
 fb.com/bholayadavmla on Facebook
 twitter.com/bholayadavmla on Twitter
 instagram.com/bholayadavmla on Instagram
 Bahadurpur Constituency

1962 births
Living people
Rashtriya Janata Dal politicians
People from Darbhanga district
Members of the Bihar Legislative Council
Politics of Darbhanga district
Bihar MLAs 2015–2020